Chromosomal landing is a genetic technique used to identify and isolate clones in a genetic library. Chromosomal landing reduces the problem of analyzing large, and/or highly repetitive genomes by minimizing the need for chromosome walking. It is based on the principle that the expected average between-marker distances can be smaller than the average insert length of a clone library containing the gene of interest. 

From the abstract of :
The strategy of chromosome walking is based on the assumption that it is difficult and time consuming to find DNA markers that are physically close to a gene of interest. Recent technological developments invalidate this assumption for many species. As a result, the mapping paradigm has now changed such that one first isolates one or more DNA marker(s) at a physical distance from the targeted gene that is less than the average insert size of the genomic library being used for clone isolation. The DNA marker is then used to screen the library and isolate (or 'land' on) the clone containing the gene, without any need for chromosome walking and its associated problems. Chromosome landing, together with the technology that has made it possible, is likely to become the main strategy by which map-based cloning is applied to isolate both major genes and genes underlying quantitative traits in plant species.

See also
 Primer walking

References

Molecular biology
Genetic engineering